Byung-ho Park (born July 10, 1986) is a South Korean professional baseball designated hitter and first baseman for the KT Wiz of the KBO League. He previously played for the LG Twins and Kiwoom Heroes, and Minnesota Twins of Major League Baseball (MLB). In the KBO, Park had two consecutive seasons with 50 home runs (2014–2015) and was the home run title winner for four consecutive seasons (2012–2015). He holds the KBO record for runs batted in during a single season, with 146 RBI in 2015.

Amateur career
Park attended Sungnam High School in Seoul. Park first gained attention at the 38th President's Cup National High School Baseball Championship, where he became the first high school player to hit four home runs in four consecutive plate appearances on April 29 and May 1, . In June 2004, Park led his team to win the 59th Blue Dragon Flag National High School Baseball Championship, ranked first in runs with 10.

In August 2004, Park was selected for the South Korean under-18 national team and participated in the World Junior Baseball Championship held in Taiwan. There he helped the team clinch bronze, leading the team's attack alongside future KBO League stars Kang Jung-ho and Choi Jeong.

Professional career

LG Twins
Park was selected by the LG Twins in the first round of the  KBO First-Year Player Draft. He entered the league with high expectations, converting his position from catcher to first baseman in his first season. However, Park batted only .190 with only 3 home runs and 21 RBIs in 79 games. In , he batted .162 with 5 home runs, spending most of the season in the minors. After the 2006 season, Park joined the Korea Armed Forces Athletic Corps Baseball Team to serve a two-year military service.

Although he came back to the Twins after being discharged from the military duty in early , Park continued to hit below the Mendoza line (.218 in 2009 and .188 in ), mostly serving as the backup to first baseman Lee Taek-keun.

Nexen Heroes
On July 31, Park was traded to the Nexen Heroes along with Shim Soo-chang for Kim Seong-hyun and Song Sin-yeong.

In , Park hit 31 home runs with 105 RBIs, and led the league in slugging percentage (.561). He also won the 2012 KBO League Most Valuable Player Award and the Golden Glove Award at first base.

Park showed improved performances in the  season. He hit 37 home runs, slugging percentage (.602), 117 RBIs and scored 91 runs in 2013. He also played all 128 regular-season games as the team's starting first baseman and cleanup hitter. He was selected as an All-Star, won the 2013 KBO League MVP and Gold Glove Award at first base. In the last semi-playoff game against the Doosan Bears, Park hit a three-run home run against Doosan Bears pitcher Dustin Nippert to even up the score from 0–3 to 3–3 with two outs in the bottom of the 9th inning.

During the 2014 season, he batted .303 with 52 homers and 146 RBIs in 124 games with Nexen in the KBO. His 2015 season with the Heroes was even more impressive, as he batted .343 with 53 home runs, and he set a KBO record for runs batted in with 146.

Minnesota Twins

The Minnesota Twins of Major League Baseball won the rights to negotiate with Park during the 2015–16 offseason after placing a $12.85 million bid through the posting system. On December 1, 2015, Park signed a four-year, $12 million contract with the Twins.

On April 8, 2016, Park hit his first career MLB home run off of Joakim Soria in a game against the Kansas City Royals. After batting .191 in 62 games for the Twins, he was optioned to the Rochester Red Wings of the Class AAA International League and was never called back up. Park was designated for assignment on February 3, 2017 to make room for Matt Belisle on the roster. On March 30, Park was outrighted, and reassigned to Minor League camp. He spent the entire 2017 season in the minors, and hit .253 with 14 home runs and 60 RBI in 111 games. During the offseason, Park asked to be released by the Twins organization in order to return to the KBO League.

Return to Nexen
On November 26, 2017, Park signed a one-year, $1.4 million contract to return to the Nexen Heroes. He became a free agent following the 2021 season.

KT Wiz
On December 28, 2021, Park signed a three-year contract with the KT Wiz.

International career 
He represented South Korea at the 2014 Asian Games, 2015 WBSC Premier12 and 2018 Asian Games.

References

External links 

 Career statistics and player information from KBO League

1986 births
Living people
Asian Games gold medalists for South Korea
Asian Games medalists in baseball
Baseball players at the 2014 Asian Games
Baseball players at the 2018 Asian Games
KBO League first basemen
LG Twins players
Major League Baseball designated hitters
Major League Baseball first basemen
Major League Baseball players from South Korea
Medalists at the 2014 Asian Games
Medalists at the 2018 Asian Games
Minnesota Twins players
Kiwoom Heroes players
Sportspeople from North Jeolla Province
Rochester Red Wings players
South Korean expatriate baseball players in the United States
2015 WBSC Premier12 players
2023 World Baseball Classic players